Events in the year 1873 in Brazil.

Incumbents
Monarch – Pedro II
Prime Minister – Viscount of Rio Branco

Events
Itu Convention, first Republican Convention in Brazil in Itu, 18th of April

Births
 20 July - Alberto Santos-Dumont
 9 September - José Plácido de Castro

Deaths

References

 
1870s in Brazil
Years of the 19th century in Brazil
Brazil
Brazil